The Bakanas is a river in the Abai Region, Kazakhstan.

The Bakanas flows near Ayagoz city in its upper course. Barshatas town is located on the left bank of the river.

Course
The Bakanas river originates in the Chingiztau range of the eastern Kazakh Uplands. Its source is in the southwestern slopes, near the Akbaytal mountain pass. It heads roughly southwards, bending southeastwards in its middle course after its confluence with the Dagandeli. Finally it fans out, divides into shallow arms, and its waters disperse in the semidesert sands to the north of the eastern end of the Balkhash lakeshore. The river is fed mainly by snow, but it usually carries very little water, and only in the spring, beginning in late March or early April and ending in May or June. In some years it dries up in its lower course. Very rarely, in extremely wet years, the Bakanas flows from the right into the Ayaguz River, which has its mouth in Lake Balkhash.

Tributaries
The Bakanas freezes between December and March.

See also
List of rivers of Kazakhstan

References

External links

The Great Silk Road in Central and Eastern Kazakhstan
Plant diversity in the early Devonian

Rivers of Kazakhstan
Balkhash-Alakol Basin